Marco Armellino (born 21 August 1989) is an Italian professional footballer who plays as a midfielder for  club Modena.

Club career
Born in Vico Equense, Campania, Armellino followed his hometown club promoted to the fourth division in 2009. However, after a season in professional league the club folded. In 2010, he was signed by the third division club Sorrento, also in Campania region. In January 2012 Armellino was signed by Serie B club Reggina.

On 2 August 2013 he joined Cremonese in temporary deal.

At the beginning of the 2014–15 season for Reggina, he wore the captain's armband under coach Francesco Cozza. He was replaced as captain later in the season by Bruno Cirillo.

On 27 July 2015, Armellino was signed by Matera.

On 9 August 2017 Armellino was signed by Lecce. he scored 3 goals in 34 matches, helping the giallorossi side to gain promotion to Serie B.

He started the 2018–19 season with Lecce and scored one goal in 8 appearances, but on 21 January 2019 he joined Monza on a permanent basis.

On 24 August 2021, Armellino joined Modena on a permanent basis. He made his debut on 29 August in a 0–0 draw against Grosseto. On 19 September, he scored his first goal for the club to secure a 4–0 away win over Fermana at Stadio Bruno Recchioni.

Personal life 
Armellino and his partner, Rosaria, have a son called Mattia, born on 17 June 2020.

Honours 
Lecce
 Serie C Group C: 2017–18

Monza
 Serie C Group A: 2019–20

References

External links
 Lega Serie B profile (data by Panini Digital) 
 profile at Associazione Italiana Calciatori official site (data by www.football.it) 
 
 

1989 births
Living people
Sportspeople from the Province of Naples
Footballers from Campania
Italian footballers
Association football midfielders
Serie B players
Serie C players
Lega Pro Seconda Divisione players
F.C. Real Città di Vico Equense players
A.S.D. Sorrento players
Reggina 1914 players
U.S. Cremonese players
Matera Calcio players
U.S. Lecce players
A.C. Monza players
Modena F.C. 2018 players